Ralph Eugene Neely (September 12, 1943 – January 5, 2022) was an American professional football player who was an offensive tackle for the Dallas Cowboys in the National Football League (NFL). He played 13 seasons and 172 games for the Cowboys from 1965 to 1977.

Early years
Neely attended Farmington High School, where he was an All-State tackle for two years in football, and a standout center for the basketball team.

He was recruited by the University of Oklahoma, where he played college football under coaches Bud Wilkinson and Gomer Jones. Neely was a 261-pound tackle who played both ways, as a dominant performer on defense and an excellent blocker on offense. He was named the Big Eight sophomore lineman of the year and was a two-time All-American and an all-conference selection in both 1963 and '64.

Neely was one of three Sooners stars who missed the 1965 Gator Bowl game against Florida State University. Neely, fullback Jim Grisham and halfback Lance Rentzel signed with professional teams before the game, and were ruled ineligible for the contest, which Florida State won 36–19 on the strength of four touchdown catches by Fred Biletnikoff.

Professional career
In 1965, he was drafted in the second round of both the 1965 NFL Draft (by the Baltimore Colts) and the 1965 AFL Draft (by the Houston Oilers). The Colts traded his NFL contractual rights to the Dallas Cowboys in exchange for Billy Lothridge and a fourth-round selection in the 1966 NFL Draft on August 29, 1965.

Neely accepted the Oilers contract offer (which also included rights to own a Houston gas station), but requested it be kept secret to remain eligible to play in the Gator Bowl. When he learned that the Colts traded his rights to the Cowboys, he began negotiating with Dallas, and returned his check to the Oilers. Litigation ensued between the Oilers and Cowboys in regards to his rights.

A rookie in 1965, he joined the Cowboys just as they were beginning their ascent in the NFL, became an immediate starter at right offensive tackle and was named to the NFL all-rookie team. With great quickness for his size, he became a dominant player on the Cowboys offensive line for 13 seasons.

One of the terms of the merger agreement between the NFL and the AFL was that the Neely contract dispute be resolved. In 1966, the Cowboys finally agreed with the Oilers to send draft choices (a first, second and two fifth round choices in the 1967 NFL Draft), pay all of the court costs and to start the annual pre-season game the Governor's Cup between the two teams.

Neely was a four-time All-Pro and a two-time Pro Bowler in 1967 and 1969. In 1970, Neely started the season at right guard, but soon took over for Tony Liscio at left offensive tackle, where he manned the position until 1977, while continuing to be one of the NFL's premier offensive linemen.

He was injured halfway into the Cowboys victorious 1971 Super Bowl season, when he fractured his left leg in an off-road motorcycle accident; and missed the rest of the year.

In 1977, Neely retired after the Cowboys won Super Bowl XII against the Denver Broncos. He was selected to the NFL 1960s All-Decade Team, though Neely has yet to join his bookend partner Rayfield Wright, in the Pro Football Hall of Fame or in the Dallas Cowboys Ring of Honor.

Later life and death
In 2018, the Professional Football Researchers Association named Neely to the PFRA Hall of Very Good Class of 2018.

Neely died on January 5, 2022, at the age of 78. He was living with dementia and the effects of chronic traumatic encephalopathy (CTE) prior to his death.

References

1943 births
2022 deaths
People from Farmington, New Mexico
Sportspeople from Little Rock, Arkansas
Players of American football from Arkansas
Players of American football from New Mexico
American football offensive tackles
Oklahoma Sooners football players
All-American college football players
Dallas Cowboys players
Eastern Conference Pro Bowl players